

Acts of the Scottish Parliament

|-
| {{|Air Departure Tax (Scotland) Act 2017|asp|2|25-07-2017|maintained=y|archived=n|An Act of the Scottish Parliament to make provision for a tax on the carriage of passengers by air from airports in Scotland.}}
|-
| {{|Limitation (Childhood Abuse) (Scotland) Act 2017|asp|3|28-07-2017|maintained=y|archived=n|An Act of the Scottish Parliament to remove the limitation period for actions of damages in respect of personal injuries resulting from childhood abuse.}}
|-
| {{|Railway Policing (Scotland) Act 2017|asp|4|01-08-2017|maintained=y|archived=n|An Act of the Scottish Parliament to make provision about the arrangements for the Police Service of Scotland to police railways and railway property; and for connected purposes.}}
|-
| {{|Contract (Third Party Rights) (Scotland) Act 2017|asp|5|30-10-2017|maintained=y|archived=n|An Act of the Scottish Parliament to make provision about the enforcement of contractual terms by third parties.}}
|-
| {{|Child Poverty (Scotland) Act 2017|asp|6|18-12-2017|maintained=y|archived=n|An Act of the Scottish Parliament to set targets relating to the eradication of child poverty; to make provision about plans and reports relating to the targets; and to establish the Poverty and Inequality Commission and provide for its functions.}}
|-
| {{|Seat Belts on School Transport (Scotland) Act 2017|asp|7|18-12-2017|maintained=y|archived=n|An Act of the Scottish Parliament to require that motor vehicles provided for the dedicated transport of pupils are fitted with seat belts.}}
}}

See also
List of Acts of the Scottish Parliament

References
Current Law Statutes Annotated 2017

2017